London is a home rule-class city in Laurel County, Kentucky, in the United States. It is the seat of its county. The population was 7,993 at the time of the 2010 census. It is the second-largest city named "London" in the United States and the fourth-largest in the world. It is part of the London, Kentucky micropolitan area. Of the seventeen micropolitan areas in Kentucky, London is the largest; the London micropolitan area's 2010 Census population was 126,368. London is also home to the annual World Chicken Festival that celebrates the life of Colonel Sanders and features the world's largest skillet.

History
Upon the establishment of Laurel County in 1825, a vote was held to provide for the new area's seat of government. The land offered by John Jackson and his son Jarvis Jackson was selected, along with their suggested name of London, honoring their English heritage. The town was founded the next year, its post office established in 1831, and its city rights granted in 1836.

One of John Jackson’s sons was Hancock Lee Jackson, 13th governor of Missouri. His second cousin was Claiborne Fox Jackson, 15th governor of Missouri.

During the late 1930s and early 1940s, London served as a central collection agency for books donated to the Pack Horse Library Project. It also had a pack horse library which delivered books to rural residents in the mountains.

Geography

U.S. Route 25 passes through London as its Main Street. Route 25 leads northwest  to Mount Vernon and south  to Corbin. Interstate 75, running parallel to US 25, passes along the western edge of London, with access from Exits 38 and 41. I-75 leads north  to Lexington and south  to Knoxville, Tennessee. The Hal Rogers Parkway runs along the northern edge of London, leading east  to Garrard and west  to Somerset.

Between the 2000 and 2010 censuses, the city annexed a significant portion of land.

Demographics

As of the census of 2000, there were 5,692 people, 2,400 households, and 1,461 families residing in the city. The racial makeup of the city was 96.03% White, 1.83% African American, 0.33% Native American, 0.69% Asian, 0.11% from other races, and 1.02% from two or more races. Hispanic or Latino of any race were 0.47% of the population.

There were 2,400 households, out of which 25.3% had children under the age of 18 living with them, 44.8% were married couples living together, 13.7% had a female householder with no husband present, and 39.1% were non-families. 35.9% of all households were made up of individuals, and 16.5% had someone living alone who was 65 years of age or older. The average household size was 2.16 and the average family size was 2.78.

In the city, the population was spread out, with 19.3% under the age of 18, 9.7% from 18 to 24, 28.1% from 25 to 44, 23.4% from 45 to 64, and 19.5% who were 65 years of age or older. The median age was 40 years. For every 100 females, there were 87.3 males. For every 100 females age 18 and over, there were 84.6 males.

The median income for a household in the city was $27,283, and the median income for a family was $34,340. Males had a median income of $32,355 versus $19,873 for females. The per capita income for the city was $15,046. About 19.4% of families and 20.7% of the population were below the poverty line, including 31.9% of those under age 18 and 18.4% of those age 65 or over.

Climate
London has a humid subtropical climate (Köppen Cfa) with continental influences. Summers are hot and humid with frequent storms. Winters are cold with a few mild periods.

Education
Public schools are administered by Laurel County Public Schools. The district has two comprehensive high schools: North Laurel High School and South Laurel High School.

There is a private school, London Christian Academy.

Colleges
 Laurel Technical College
 Somerset Community and Technical College (Laurel Campus)

Public library
London has a lending library, the Laurel County Public Library.

Economy
Major employers in London include:

ABC Group 
Aisin
Bimbo Bakeries USA
Flowers Foods
Maximus
Hearthside Food Solutions
Highlands Diversified Services
Niflheim Finances
Springleaf Financial
Senture 
SourceHOV 
Walmart
Xerox
Serco

Notable people
 Granville Pearl Aikman, Kansas state judge
 Teel Bruner, College Football Hall of Fame inductee
 Chera-Lyn Cook, Miss Kentucky 1998; placed 4th runner-up to Miss America 1999
 Brady J. Deaton, Chancellor of the University of Missouri
 Donald Harvey, serial killer
 Silas House, author
 Gene Huff, politician
 Nan Phelps, artist
 Darrell Scott, musician
 Flem D. Sampson, 42nd governor of Kentucky

See also

Sue Bennett College
London-Corbin Airport
London, Kentucky micropolitan area

References

External links

 City of London
 Laurel Tourism
 Laurel County History Museum & Genealogy Center

Cities in Kentucky
County seats in Kentucky
Cities in Laurel County, Kentucky
Populated places established in 1836
1836 establishments in Kentucky